Chord Energy Corporation is a company engaged in hydrocarbon exploration and hydraulic fracturing in the Williston Basin in North Dakota and Montana. It is organized in Delaware and headquartered in Houston, Texas, with an office in Williston, North Dakota. The company was formerly known as Oasis Petroleum.

History

In February 2007, Oasis Petroleum was founded by Thomas B. Nusz and Taylor L. Reid and was financed by EnCap Investments.

In 2010, the company became a public company via an initial public offering which raised over $400 million.

In 2013, the company acquired 161,000 net acres in the Williston Basin for $1.5 billion.

In 2016, the company acquired 55,000 net acres and 226 gross operated drilling locations in the Williston Basin from SM Energy for $785 million.

In 2017, the company completed the corporate spin-off of its midstream operations. The same year, Oasis Petroleum acquired 20,300 net acres in the Delaware Basin for $946 million. It sold these assets in 2021.

In September 2020, the company filed prematurely for Chapter 11 bankruptcy; it emerged from bankruptcy in November 2020.  

In July 2022, the company merged with Whiting Petroleum and was renamed Chord Energy.

References

External links

Companies based in Houston
Companies listed on the Nasdaq
Oil companies of the United States
Petroleum in Texas